Charles Edgar Schoenbaum (April 28, 1893 – January 23, 1951) was an American cinematographer whose career began in 1917 and ended with his death in 1951.

Schoenbaum worked on over 100 films, including several of the Lassie films in the late 1940s. He was nominated for an Academy Award in 1949 for his work on Little Women.

Partial filmography

The Woman God Forgot (1917)
Love Insurance (1919)
Hawthorne of the U.S.A. (1919)
Too Much Johnson (1919)
The Six Best Cellars (1920)
Held by the Enemy (1920)
Always Audacious (1920)
The Charm School (1921)
The Love Special (1921)
Too Much Speed (1921)
The Hell Diggers (1921)
Exit the Vamp (1921)
Rent Free (1922)
The World's Champion (1922)
Across the Continent (1922)
On the High Seas (1922)
The Heart Raider (1923)
Empty Hands (1924)
Code of the Sea (1924)
Adventure (1925)
The Devil's Cargo (1925)
A Son of His Father (1925)
The Vanishing American (1925)
The Last Frontier (1926)
The Mysterious Rider (1927)
Nevada (1927)
Beau Sabreur (1928)
Under the Tonto Rim (1928)
The Vanishing Pioneer (1928)
The Water Hole (1928)
The Rogue Song (1930)
Bride of the Regiment (1930)
She Got What She Wanted (1930)
Woman Hungry (1931)
Salvation Nell (1931)
Fisherman's Wharf (1939)
Little Women (1949)

References

External links

 

1951 deaths
1893 births
American cinematographers